Max Robertson (born 14 September 1954) is  a former Australian rules footballer who played with South Melbourne in the Victorian Football League (VFL).

Notes

External links 		
		
		
	
		
Living people		
1954 births		
Australian rules footballers from Victoria (Australia)		
Sydney Swans players